Benjamin Franklin Seldon, usually referred to as Benjamin F. Seldon or B. F. Seldon, was an African American educator. He served in World War I as a YMCA secretary, taught at the University of Toulouse, and was State Supervisor of Negro Adult Education in New Jersey in the late 1930s. He was a collaborator and correspondent with the Pan-Africanist intellectual W. E. B. Du Bois.

Life
Seldon studied at Centenary Collegiate Institute, graduating in 1903. In a 1924 résumé preserved in the Du Bois papers, Seldon claimed to have been "prepared for college at Phillips Exeter Academy", before studying at New York City College, Boston University and Harvard University. Though his name is not found in the 1787-1903 register, he was writing from Exeter Academy in April 1905, putting himself forward to W. E. B. DuBois as a potential agent for the distribution of The Souls of Black Folk.

In 1905 he was YMCA Secretary at New Haven, a job he took for two years. He then worked at the Colored Orphan Asylum in New York City, and as Principal of the Freehold Grammar School in Freehold, New Jersey. When Du Bois founded The Crisis in 1910 Seldon was an employee for a few months.

In World War I Seldon served as a YMCA secretary with allied military in France, a space in which African American and West African soldiers interacted. Seldon created a set of illustrated drawings of black servicemen, intending to sell them as souvenir postcards:

Seldon stayed in Europe after the war. He attended the first Pan African Congress in 1919. He also offered to help W. E. B. DuBois with organization of the second Pan African Congress in 1921, though in the event was unable to attend the congress. He married a wealthy Frenchwoman and taught at the University of Toulouse, studying social conditions within European countries. There in the mid-1920s, he passed on copies of The Crisis to black students from French colonies. As he wrote to W. E. B. DuBois in 1925, "I have asked myself, and that very seriously, why not an International A.A.C.P.?"

In the late 1920s Seldon returned to the USA, working at a new plantation operated by the Southern Sugar Company, Azucar, in Canal Point, Florida,   There he established and acted as principal of a grammar school, and established other community institutions:

Seldon returned to Toulouse in the early 1930s, and for the next few years moved between France and America. He hoped to complete "a comparative study (political, economic, religious, social and educational) of the southern Negro and the European peasant", though the book was never published. He helped supervise an anthology of black poetry, edited by Beatrice F. Wormley and Charles W. Carter. From 1938 to 1941 he was State Supervisor of Negro Adult Education for the New Jersey Works Progress Administration. In 1944 he was working as a 'Promotion Specialist' for the Interracial Section of the War Finance Division of the US Treasury.

Seldon died in Newark City Hospital on August 5, 1949. He was survived by his wife, who continued living in Cier-de-Rivière, France. Seldon's papers are held at the New York Public Library, and correspondence with Du Bois is held at the University of Massachusetts Amherst.

References

External links
 
 WW1 photograph of Seldon

Year of birth missing
19th-century births
1949 deaths
Academic staff of the University of Toulouse
20th-century African-American academics
20th-century American academics
African-American schoolteachers
Educational administrators
United States Department of the Treasury officials